Aziz Rohallah (born July 5, 1980) is an Afghan footballer. He has played for the Afghanistan national team.

National team statistics

External links

1980 births
Living people
Afghan footballers
Association football defenders
Afghanistan international footballers